Thomas Joseph Kiernan (7 January 1939 – 3 February 2022) was an Ireland international rugby union player. He won 54 caps for Ireland as a full-back between 1960 and 1973 and captained his country 24 times. At the time of his retirement he was Ireland's most-capped player, most experienced captain, and record scorer in internationals with 158 points. He captained the 1968 British Lions tour to South Africa, playing in all four internationals against South Africa. His nephew, Mike Kiernan, also played for Ireland and the Lions. Kiernan was also the Munster team coach for their famous victory over the All Blacks in 1978. He received the IRB Distinguished Service Award in 2001. He died on 3 February 2022, at the age of 83.

References

1939 births
2022 deaths
World Rugby Hall of Fame inductees
Irish rugby union players
Ireland international rugby union players
British & Irish Lions rugby union players from Ireland
Rugby union fullbacks
Munster Rugby non-playing staff
Irish Exiles non-playing staff
Cork Constitution players
University College Cork RFC players
People educated at Presentation Brothers College, Cork
Rugby union players from County Cork
Munster Rugby players